Nobody No-One is a character in the Big Finish Productions audio plays Forty-Five: The Word Lord and A Death in the Family written by Steven Hall, which are based on the British science fiction television series Doctor Who. He is an original character and does not appear in the television series.

Description

Nobody No-One is a renegade Word Lord, much like a Time Lord, from a reality 45 billion dimensions to the left of ours. In his dimension, language (rather than matter and energy) is the principal form of physics. Not much is known about the Word Lords, apart from Nobody. What is known is that their founder was called All. He is said to have created something called The Hand of All, similar to the Hand of Omega created by Rassilon and Omega. The Hand of All was a synthetic universe made of constantly spoken words. Rather than a TARDIS, the Word Lords' vehicle is a CORDIS, a Conveyance Of Repeating Dialogue In Space/Time. It doesn't have a physical form, but its chameleon meme function can disguise it as a phrase that comes up in casual conversations when it's near. When Nobody's CORDIS arrives, its engines cause people to say or read 45 or numbers or phrases that composite 45. It can also provide him with physical items like guns and even a physical body to exist in our universe, albeit not one that can be killed by conventional physics.

Many of Nobody No-One's powers derive from the words spoken by the people in his vicinity. For example, if a person says "Nobody can get into the TARDIS" or "No-one can turn off the Sun", then he suddenly can get into the TARDIS or turn off the Sun. He is a ruthless, even flippant murderer and occasionally a raving maniac, but always very clever. He has a great interest in the Doctor, and has met his Seventh incarnation several times, although not in the same chronological order. He even stated that the Doctor was a relative, possibly meaning that he's the Doctor's equivalent in his dimension. Nobody initially hoped to kill the Doctor to collect one or more of the many bounties issued by many alien races, including Daleks and Cybermen.

Forty-Five

He first appeared in The Word Lord, a one part story in the four part Forty-five audio drama collection.  He chased the Doctor through several times and places, always missing him.  In 1945, Nobody regenerated, for unspecified reasons.  While he recovered, he hid at an alien research facility called The Forge, disguising his ship as their catch phrase, "For King and Country".  A hundred years later, he finally made contact with the Doctor in the Antarctic.  With his ship now hidden as a joke, he infiltrated a top secret bunker holding an important peace summit. It is unclear if this is their first meeting, although the Doctor has knowledge of Word Lords and their abilities.  Luckily for him, the bunker had a security black-out, no phones, books or even writing material.  The Doctor was able to shut off the translation circuits to his TARDIS, forcing Nobody to flee into the only book available, a protocol guide for the bunker.  He escaped, after soldiers carelessly said "Nobody move", leading to several unchronicled run-ins with the Seventh Doctor, throughout their long lives.

A Death in the Family

At some point, someone (possibly the Doctor), tripped the CORDIS over a lost letter in the English alphabet, resulting in a crash that forced Nobody to regenerate again.  This new No-One (sporting a long scarf as an homage) first appeared in A Death in the Family.  A much older Seventh Doctor took the Hand of All into his own mind and trapped Nobody within it.  Then the Doctor placed himself within a Time Lord casket, falling into a mumbling trance to keep the Hand functioning.  The casket fell into the possession of the Forge and was placed deep within their underground archival vaults, somewhere near London.

After the final destruction of the Forge in 2026, the Seventh Doctor found the sarcophagus with his older self inside.  Nobody No-One escaped and confronted the younger Seventh Doctor.  London was mostly evacuated at this time, but there were still many people and forms of communication for Nobody to utilize.  He quickly amassed power over the Earth and even the Doctor's very existence.  Realizing the imminent danger, the younger Doctor sacrificed his own life fighting No-one.  However, the older Doctor set forth an elaborate long term plan in which the Hand of All could be used by his companions, Ace and Hex, to bring him back to life.  As soon as he was resurrected, he once again tricked Nobody into being trapped within the Hand.  The Doctor then visited his old friend Evelyn Smythe on the day she died and, with her permission, the Hand of All was placed in her mind.  Evelyn, the Hand and Nobody died together.  Nobody No-one was first voiced by Paul Reynolds and then by Ian Reddington.

Appearances

Forty-five
A Death in the Family

External links
Big Finish Productions - Forty Five
Big Finish Productions - A Death in the Family
Big Finish Productions - Word Lord for 99p!

Doctor Who audio characters